Hyon Yong-chol (January 11, 1949 – rumored April 30, 2015) was a North Korean general and Workers' Party of Korea (WPK) politician. He served as Minister of Defence from 2014 to 2015. In 2015, he was reportedly removed from his post.

Personal life and career
North Korean media have stated that Hyon was born in January 1949 and joined the military in 1966. Having served as a battalion commander, he was elected a delegate to the Supreme People's Assembly in 2009. Hyon was promoted to the rank of four-star general alongside Kim Jong-un, Kim Kyong-hui, Kim Kyong-ok, Choe Ryong-hae, and Choe Pu-il in September 2010. He was on the national funeral committee in the wake of Kim Jong-il's death in December 2011. Hyon was named as a member of the Central Committee of the Workers' Party of Korea at the third party conference. In February 2012, Hyon received the Order of Kim Jong-il.

Hyon was promoted to the rank of Vice Marshal of the KPA in July 2012, two days after Chief of the General Staff Ri Yong-ho was relieved of his duties. It was initially unclear if Hyon would replace Ri as Chief of the General Staff, but this was confirmed a few days later. He was also identified as vice-chairman of the WPK Central Military Commission on 26 July 2012.

Hyon was reportedly demoted to General in November 2012. On 31 March 2013, Hyon was made a Politburo alternate member, though he did not take Ri Yong-ho's former seat on the Politburo Presidium. He was transferred to command the 5th Army Corps in May 2013. He was called back to Pyongyang in June 2014 to serve as minister of the People's Armed Forces.

Ouster and rumoured execution
South Korea's National Intelligence Service initially reported on May 12, 2015, that Hyon was purged and publicly executed near the end of April 2015 at Kanggon Military Training Area near Pyongyang. It was reported that he was executed – with an anti-aircraft gun – for insubordination and sleeping during formal military rallies, in particular during an event in late April 2015 attended by Kim Jong-un in which Hyon was captured on video napping. A report by CNN indicated that Hyon was accused of treason after he failed to carry out an order by Kim Jong-un, though the nature of this order was not specified. A top official stated that while executions take place for crimes of treason or subversion, Hyon was not among the executed. According to analysts interviewed by BBC News, while reassigning officials was commonplace in North Korea, the execution of a figure as close to Kim Jong-un as Hyon was surprising, and could give cause to concern for the country's stability.

Hours after the initial report, South Korea's National Intelligence Service revised its statement, saying that although it has intelligence information suggesting that Hyon was executed, it had not been able to verify that. Doubts were raised because footage of Hyon was still being shown on North Korean television. He was also mentioned in the North Korean newspaper Rodong Sinmun the day he was supposed to have been executed. This would imply that he had been arrested and executed on the same day, which is unlikely. In July, official North Korea media named Pak Yong-sik as the armed forces minister, but did not report Hyon's removal. A South Korean spokesman said that reports of Hyon's execution should be taken as rumors until there was definitive evidence.

His rumoured execution was never confirmed.

Awards and honors
The official portrait of Hyon illustrates Hyon wearing all the decorations awarded to him.

 Order of Kim Il-sung

 Order of Kim Jong-il

 Order of the National Flag First Class, seven times

 Order of Freedom and Independence First Class, twice

 Order of Korean Labour, twice

 Commemorative Order "50th Anniversary of the Foundation of the Democratic People's Republic of Korea"

 Commemorative Order "Anniversary of the Foundation of the People's Army"

 Order of Military Service Honour First Class

 Commemorative Order "30th Anniversary of the Agricultural Presentation"

 Order of the National Flag Second Class, three times

 Order of Freedom and Independence Second Class

 Order of Military Service Honour Second Class

 Order of the Red Banner of Three Great Revolutions

 Order of the National Flag Third Class, twice

 Order of Military Service Honour Third Class

 Soldier's Medal of Honour Second Class

 Commemorative Medal "The Foundation of the People's Republic of Korea"

 Medal For Military Merit

References

|-

|-

|-

1949 births
North Korean generals
Defence ministers of North Korea
Recipients of the Order of Kim Jong-il
Possibly living people
Purges in North Korea
Alternate members of the 6th Politburo of the Workers' Party of Korea
Members of the 6th Central Committee of the Workers' Party of Korea
People from North Hamgyong